In enzymology, an anthranilate 3-monooxygenase (deaminating) is an enzyme that catalyzes the chemical reaction

anthranilate + NADPH + H+ + O2  2,3-dihydroxybenzoate + NADP+ + NH3

The 4 substrates of this enzyme are anthranilate, NADPH, H+, and O2, whereas its 3 products are 2,3-dihydroxybenzoate, NADP+, and NH3.

This enzyme belongs to the family of oxidoreductases, specifically those acting on paired donors, with O2 as oxidant and incorporation or reduction of oxygen. The oxygen incorporated need not be derived from O2 with NADH or NADPH as one donor, and incorporation of one atom o oxygen into the other donor.  The systematic name of this enzyme class is anthranilate,NADPH:oxygen oxidoreductase (3-hydroxylating, deaminating). Other names in common use include anthranilate hydroxylase, anthranilate 2,3-dioxygenase (deaminating), anthranilate hydroxylase (deaminating), anthranilic hydroxylase, and anthranilate 2,3-hydroxylase (deaminating).  This enzyme participates in 3 metabolic pathways: benzoate degradation via hydroxylation, carbazole degradation, and nitrogen metabolism.

References

 
 

EC 1.14.13
NADPH-dependent enzymes
Enzymes of unknown structure
Anthranilates